FUNET is the Finnish University and Research Network, a backbone network providing Internet connections for Finnish universities and polytechnics as well as other research facilities. It is governed by the state-owned CSC – IT Center for Science Ltd. The FUNET project started in December 1983 and soon gained international connectivity via EARN with DECnet as the dominant protocol. FUNET was connected to the greater Internet through NORDUnet in 1988. The FUNET FTP service went online in 1990, hosting the first versions of Linux in 1991.

The main backbone connections have gradually been upgraded to optical fiber since 2008. First 100 Gbit/s connections were put in production in 2015. FUNET is connected to other research networks through NORDUnet, and to other Finnish ISPs via three FICIX points.

See also
NORDUnet
GEANT

References

External links
 Funet Network Services provided by CSC - IT Center for Science
 Funet FTP archive
 CSC — IT Center for Science Ltd.

Communications in Finland
Education in Finland
Internet in Finland
Internet mirror services
National research and education networks